Gawin may refer to:

Gawin (surname)
Gawin, Kuyavian-Pomeranian Voivodeship